The knockout stage of the 2019 Sudirman Cup was the final stage of the competition, following the group stage. It began on 23 May with the quarter-finals and ended on 26 May with the final match of the tournament, held at Guangxi Sports Center in Nanning, China. For Group 1, the top two teams from each group (8 in total) advanced to the final knockout stage to compete in a single-elimination tournament. Teams from group 2 and 3 (16 in total) play round robin in respective subgroup and advanced to classification round to determine the overall placings, meanwhile teams from group 4 play in a single round robin format for final placings.

Qualified teams

Group 1

Group 2

Group 3

Bracket

Group 1
The draw for the quarterfinals was held after the completion of the final matches in the group stage on 22 May 2019.

Group 2

Group 3

Classification round

Twenty-seventh place match: Nepal vs Lithuania

Twenty-fifth place match: New Zealand vs Slovakia

Twenty-third place match: Australia vs Switzerland

Twenty-first place match: Ireland vs Sri Lanka

Nineteenth place match: United States vs Israel

Seventeenth place match: Vietnam vs Singapore

Fifteenth place match: Netherlands vs Germany

Thirteenth place match: France vs Canada

Quarter-finals

China vs Denmark

South Korea vs Thailand

Chinese Taipei vs Indonesia

Malaysia vs Japan

Semi-finals

China vs Thailand

Indonesia vs Japan

Final

China vs Japan

References

External links
 

2019 Sudirman Cup
Sudirman Cup knockout stage